Pandora Hearts (stylized as PandoraHearts) is a Japanese manga series written and illustrated by Jun Mochizuki. It was serialized in Square Enix's shōnen manga magazine Monthly GFantasy from May 2006 to March 2015, with its chapters collected in twenty-four tankōbon volumes. In North America, it was originally licensed for an English release by Broccoli Books, but was later dropped. It was relicensed by Yen Press. The story follows Oz Vessalius, the 15-year old heir to the house of Vessalius. During his coming-of-age ceremony is set upon by strangers who condemn him for the sin of being alive and banish him into the depths of Abyss, an otherworldly dimension.

A 25-episode anime television series adaptation by Xebec was broadcast from April to September 2009. A nine-episode extra original video animation (OVA) was released from July 2009 to March 2010. In North America, the anime series was licensed by NIS America.

Plot

Oz is the heir to the Vessalius house, one of the Four Great Dukedoms given excessive power by the country's royalty. He lives a luxurious life alongside his younger sister Ada and valet and best friend Gilbert. This extravagant lifestyle is only diminished by the constant absence of Oz's father Xai, who decided Oz and Ada should be raised by their uncle Oscar when they were still babies. When Oz goes to his Coming-of-Age Ceremony, he meets Sharon Rainsworth and her ominous servant Xerxes Break. Everything appears normal until the Coming-of-Age Ceremony rituals are completed and the giant clock that hasn't worked in a century moves. Suddenly, a group of people in red cloaks known as the Baskervilles proceed to reveal themselves. The Baskervilles say he must be dragged into a supernatural prison called Abyss where monsters called Chains live, a place previously believed to have only existed in fairy tales. The Baskervilles then force Oz into the Abyss, claiming his existence to be a sin, although Oz is clueless as to the true meaning behind these words and the desire to acquire it becomes a driving force for the rest of the series.

Trapped in the Abyss, Oz finds out he can make contracts with Chains by drinking their blood. He does so with a Chain named Alice, infamously known as the Bloody Black Rabbit (or B-Rabbit for short), in order to escape the prison. By the time they escape from the Abyss, ten years have already passed. He is taken under the care of Sharon and Break, who he discovers are members of a Chain-research organization called Pandora that was established a century ago after a disaster known as the Tragedy of Sablier (in which the entire city of Sablier fell into the Abyss) by the Four Great Dukedoms. Wanting to understand why his existence is supposedly a sin, Oz helps Sharon and Break in their investigation in regards to the Intention of the Abyss, the ruler of the Abyss. They have the help of Alice and adult Gilbert, who has now been adopted into the Nightray dukedom and made a contract with the family's chain, Raven. As they investigate, they learn that Alice, Gilbert, and Gilbert's odd younger brother Vincent were involved with the Tragedy of Sablier. Additionally, they come into contact with the soul of Jack Vessalius, the legendary hero of the Tragedy of Sablier who prevented the entire world from being dragged into the Abyss after such a thing happened to Sablier. Jack was also the one who established Pandora. In the current time, he lay dormant in Oz's body. Jack reveals that the one behind the Tragedy of Sablier was Glen Baskerville, the head of Baskervilles and his best friend.

Following a meeting with Duke Rufus Barma, Break reveals he became an illegal contractor thirty years prior and has met the Intention of the Abyss, who is in fact Alice's twin sister. Duke Barma reveals that, according to his ancestor Arthur Barma's memoirs, Jack has sealed Glen's soul by placing it within his own mutilated body, split into five sealing stones. Following the destruction of two of the five sealing stones, Oz and Duke Barma trick foreign noble Isla Yura into conducting a second Coming-of-Age Ceremony for the former in his mansion, wherein one of the sealing stones is located. However, in the middle of the party, Yura and his sect start killing the guests in an attempt to reenact the Tragedy of Sablier. Although Oz and his friends manage to stop Yura's cult from succeeding in their efforts, the sealing stone is destroyed by the Baskervilles and Gilbert's adoptive younger brother, Elliot Nightray, is killed. This leads to Elliot's valet Leo being taken away by Vincent, who reveals that Leo holds Glen Baskerville's soul within him, and thus is the next successor of Baskerville clan. Blaming himself for Elliot's death, Leo accepts his role as Glen Baskerville in order to destroy the Intention of the Abyss.

The Baskervilles and Pandora clash as Leo attacks the latter. Upon destroying the fourth sealing stone, the fourth seal is revealed to contain Glen's head rather than Jack's. Duke Barma then declares he has deciphered an entire code within Arthur Barma's memoirs, which, once decoded, reveal Jack is actually the one who caused the Tragedy of Sablier. Oz then witnesses Jack's memories. It is revealed from such that Jack's motivation for instigating the Tragedy was to merge the world with the Abyss and be reunited with Lacie, who was the younger sister of the previous Glen (originally known as Oswald), as well as Alice and the Intention of the Abyss's mother. Gilbert is also revealed to be a Baskerville who was originally chosen to be the next Glen a century ago. Following this revelation, Oz learns that he is actually the real B-Rabbit and used to be a sentient but still lifeless black rabbit doll that belonged to Lacie until she left him in the care of the Core of the Abyss, of whom gave him life. During the Tragedy of Sablier, Oz was turned into the most powerful Chain in existence, capable of destroying the world, by the Intention of the Abyss in order to help Jack fulfill his goal of plunging the entire world into the Abyss. Meanwhile, Oswald takes over Leo's body and decides to go back into the past to kill Lacie before she met Jack, which would prevent the birth of the Intention of the Abyss, Oz, and Jack's complete slippage of sanity following Lacie's death, thus averting the Tragedy.

Accepting his real origin, Oz decides to prevent Oswald from changing the past with the help of his friends. They come up with a plan to stop the world from falling into the Abyss without changing the past by destroying the Intention of the Abyss' body. Oz's uncle Oscar Vessalius dies on their quest, as well as Break. Traveling back one hundred years into the past during the Tragedy, Alice tries to convince the Core of the Abyss to cut her ties with her twin sister while Oz tries to convince Oswald to reconsider altering the past and focus on helping them stop Jack instead. Alice's words causes the Core to go berserk out of fear of being left alone, which results with the dimensions distorting even more and Oz and the rest being sent further back into the past, before Oswald and Lacie became Baskervilles. In the end, Oswald can't bring himself to kill his sister and passes on, returning control to Leo. Using Oz's illegal contractor seal, they reach the Core of the Abyss and manage to convince the Core to cut her ties with the Intention of the Abyss and restore the world back to normal. Oz and Alice pass away with hopeful dispositions to ensure the safety and security of the world, Gilbert promising them that he will wait for them until they are reincarnated and he can see them again. After the incident, Pandora is disbanded, the Baskervilles establish a new bond with the Core of the Abyss, and Sharon and the rest who have survived move on with their lives. Approximately a century later, Vincent brings the reincarnated Oz and Alice to Gilbert before dying in his brother's arms. Gilbert and Oz both begin crying upon seeing each other for the first time in a hundred years, and Gilbert happily welcomes him and Alice back, essentially dealing with his past griefs and remorse.

Media

Manga

Pandora Hearts, written and illustrated by Jun Mochizuki, was serialized in Square Enix's shōnen manga magazine Monthly GFantasy from May 18, 2006, to March 18, 2015. Square Enix collected its 104 chapters in twenty-four tankōbon volumes, released from October 27, 2006, to June 27, 2015.

In North America, the series was first licensed in English by Broccoli Books, but it was later dropped. It was then licensed by Yen Press and serialized in Yen Plus starting with the June 2009 issue. Yen Press released the first English volume of Pandora Hearts on December 15, 2009. In Indonesia, the series has been licensed by Elex Media Komputindo, and in France by Ki-oon. Square Enix began to publish the series in English on the website and app Manga Up! in July 2022.

Anime

Studio Xebec produced a 25-episode anime television series adaptation in 2009, it was directed by Takao Kato. The series aired from April 3 to September 25, 2009. The series broadcast on TBS, BS-TBS, CBC and MBS for its initial run. On February 11, 2010, NIS America announced the licensing of the series in North America, and released English-subtitled DVDs of the anime on October 26, 2010.

Other books

Guidebooks
Pandora Hearts 8.5: Mine of Mine was released on March 27, 2009. The guide contains a short story revolving around Gilbert Nightray and artwork, and official romanization of the Pandora Hearts cast. Oz Vessalius and Gilbert Nightray are on the guide cover, along with a plush of B-Rabbit. Pandora Hearts 18.5: Evidence is the second official guide book, released on July 27, 2012. Pandora Hearts 24 + 1: Last Dance is the third and final official guide book, released on June 27, 2015. With the release of the anime adaptation of the series, an official art book relating to the anime has been released with the title of Official Animation Guide. Contents included interviews with the author, rough drafts, and more behind the scenes.

Artbooks
Pandora Hearts Odds and Ends is the first official art book of the series. It features sketches and illustrations from volumes 1 to 10, as well illustrations from the author's previous work, Crimson-Shell. There is. is the second official art book released after the conclusion of Pandora Hearts, containing other illustrations made for the series along with art for Boukyaku no Haou Roland and other GFantasy and Gangan Joker series. The book also features the first two official illustrations for Mochizuki's next series, Vanitas no Carte.

Light Novels
Three light novels were featured alongside the manga as side stories accompanying the Pandora Hearts universe. The novels were all written by Shinobu Wakamiya and illustrated by Pandora Hearts' own author, Jun Mochizuki. The titles are Pandora Hearts ~Caucus Race~ Volume 1, Pandora Hearts ~Caucus Race~ Volume 2, and Pandora Hearts ~Caucus Race~ Volume 3.

Audio
The anime's first opening theme was released as a maxi-single, "Parallel Hearts", on April 29, 2009 under the Victor Entertainment label. The single was performed by FictionJunction and included two tracks, "Parallel Hearts" and "Hitomi No Chikara", with lyrics, composition and arrangement by Yuki Kajiura, and peaked with a ranking of 20th on the Oricon singles charts.

The first ending theme "Maze" was released on June 3, 2009 under Victor Entertainment, and peaked at 35th in the Oricon singles chart. The Second Ending theme is "Watashi wo Mitsukete" by Savage Genius. The first anime album Pandora hearts Original Soundtracks 1 was released July 8, 2009 under Victor Entertainment, and peaked at 104th on Oricon albums chart. A drama CD entitled Pandora Hearts Drama CD was released on December 21, 2007 under Frontier works.

Reception
As of March 2021, Pandora Hearts had over 5.5 million copies in circulation. The eighth volume of Pandora Hearts was ranked 21st on the Tohan charts between March 24 and 30, 2009, and 19th between March 31 and April 6, 2009. Volume nine was ranked number one between July 27 and August 2.
The twenty third and twenty fourth volumes ranked 16 and 14, respectively, between June 29 and July 5, 2015.

Kim Morrissy of Anime News Network called it as "one of the defining manga of the 00s and early 2010s".

References

External links
 
 
Anime website (Fuji Creative)

2006 manga
2009 Japanese television series endings
2009 anime OVAs
2009 anime television series debuts
Adventure anime and manga
Anime and manga based on fairy tales
Anime based on Alice in Wonderland
Anime composed by Yuki Kajiura
Anime series based on manga
Bandai Namco franchises
Dark fantasy anime and manga
Gangan Comics manga
Mystery anime and manga
Shōnen manga
Square Enix franchises
TBS Television (Japan) original programming
Xebec (studio)
Yen Press titles